Nuuk is the fifth solo album from German ambient music producer Thomas Köner. Originally released in 1997 as a part of the Driftworks 4-CD box set (along with albums from Nijiumu, Pauline Oliveros & Randy Raine-Reusch and Paul Schütze), it was re-released in 2004 by Mille Plateaux with a DVD containing films made from still images to accompany the music.

Nuuk is the capital city of Greenland. Polynya is an area of open water surrounded by sea ice. Amras is a fictional character taken from J. R. R. Tolkien's legendarium.

Track listing
"Nuuk (Air)" – 4:50
"Polynya I" – 6:33
"Nuuk (Day)" – 7:27
"Amras" – 5:37
"Nuuk (Night)" - 4:15
"Polynya II" - 7:25
"Nuuk (End)" - 6:00

 2004 DVD
"Nuuk (Suite)"
"Nuuk (Air)"
"Nuuk (Day)"
"Nuuk (Night)"
"Nuuk (End)"

1997 albums
Thomas Köner albums
Albums produced by Thomas Köner